The 2014–15 Biathlon World Cup – World Cup 2 was held in Hochfilzen, Austria, from 12 December until 15 December 2014.

Schedule of events

Medal winners

Men

Women

Achievements

 Best performance for all time

 , 71st place in Sprint
 , 2nd place in Sprint
 , 4th place in Sprint and Pursuit
 , 6th place in Sprint
 , 7th place in Sprint
 , 42nd place in Sprint and 28th place in Pursuit
 , 67th place in Sprint
 , 2nd place in Pursuit
 , 5th place in Pursuit

 First World Cup race

 , 69th place in Sprint
 , 76th place in Sprint
 , 84th place in Sprint
 , 93rd place in Sprint
 , 98th place in Sprint
 , 103rd place in Sprint
 , 17th place in Sprint
 , 63rd place in Sprint
 , 80th place in Sprint
 , 86th place in Sprint
 , 89th place in Sprint

References 

2
2014 in Austrian sport
December 2014 sports events in Europe
World Cup - World Cup 2,2014-15
Sport in Tyrol (state)